Jalmenus pseudictinus, Macqueen's hairstreak, is a butterfly of the family Lycaenidae. It is endemic to the northern Gulf, the north-east coast and the Murray–Darling basin in Queensland, Australia.

The wingspan is about 30 mm.

The larvae feed on various Acacia species, including A. flavescens and A. harpophylla, as well as Heterodendrum diversifolium and Alectryon connatus.

The caterpillars are attended by the ant species Froggattella kirbii.

References

External links
Australian Insects 
Australian Faunal Directory

Theclinae
Butterflies described in 1967
Butterflies of Australia